The river name Ems may refer to:
 Ems (river), a river in northwestern Germany and northeastern Netherlands, discharges in the Dollart Bay
 Ems (Eder), a river of Hesse, Germany, tributary of the Eder
 River Ems (Chichester Harbour), a river in the English counties of West Sussex and Hampshire